Kazimierz Zalewski (December 5, 1849 – January 11, 1919), pseudonym Jerzy Myriel, was a Polish dramatist, literary and theatre critic, one of the leading author of middle-class positivistic drama.

Zalewski was born in Płock.  He was the publisher and editor of the magazine Wiek (1875–1905), and managing director of Teatr Mały in Warsaw from 1909 until his death, in Warsaw.

Notable works
 Socio-psychological comedies
 Przed ślubem (1875)
 Dama treflowa (1879)
 Górą nasi (1885)
 Nasi zięciowie (1886)
 Małżeństwo Apfel (1887)

Novels
 Syn przemytnika (1884)

References

External links

Further reading

1849 births
1919 deaths
Writers  from Płock
Polish literary critics
Polish theatre critics
19th-century Polish novelists
20th-century Polish novelists
Polish male novelists
19th-century Polish dramatists and playwrights
Polish male dramatists and playwrights
Polish opinion journalists
19th-century Polish male writers
20th-century Polish male writers
20th-century Polish dramatists and playwrights

Polish positivists